The Vice President of Colombia, officially known as the Vice President of the Republic of Colombia or Vice President of the Nation is the first in the presidential line of succession, becoming the new president of Colombia upon leave of absence or death, resignation, or removal of the president, as designated by the Colombian Constitution of 1991 which also reinstated the vice president figure after almost a century of being abolished during the presidency of Rafael Núñez.

The vice president cannot assume presidential functions on temporary absences of the president such as official trips abroad or vacations. In these cases, the president delegates functions to a cabinet member, usually the Minister of the Interior.

The current Vice President is Francia Márquez, who took office on 7 August 2022.

History and development

Constitutional Convention
The position of vice president was not mentioned in the Constitutional Convention that gave rise to the Constitution of Cúcuta in 1821, where it was established that the country would be governed by a president for a period of 4 years and that, in the event of temporary or permanent absence, he would be replaced by the vice president, who would also be the head of the Governing Council. The first presidency was in the hands of Simón Bolívar, while Francisco de Paula Santander was appointed as vice president. the different visions of the State -one of law and the other of dictatorship. While Bolívar carried out the southern campaign -in which the freedom of Ecuador, Peru and Bolivia was achieved-, Santander assumed the full powers of the presidency.

In the absence of Simón Bolívar, Santander was in charge of legally organizing the nascent country and organized the administration of justice. Likewise, he promoted education, of a Lancasterian nature, and fought to remove the monopoly of education from the Catholic Church. The Santanderist measures were not to the liking of Simón Bolívar, who classified them as an abuse of power.

In 1826, in his speech before the Constituent Congress of Bolivia, Bolívar hinted at the differences that separated him from his former comrade in arms: "The vice president must be the purest man: the reason is that if the Prime Magistrate does not elect a very upright citizen should fear him as a bitter enemy; and suspect even of his secret ambitions. This vice president must strive to deserve his good services the credit he needs to perform the highest functions and expect the great national reward: the supreme command "

Santander held power until 1827, when Simón Bolívar returned from his campaigns. Almost a year later, and faced with so many clashes of criteria with his second in command, Bolívar ended the figure of the vice president and suspended the Constitution of Cúcuta, to make way for the dictatorship. The authoritarian government of Bolívar did not last long and in 1830 the Admirable Congress was convened to draft a new constitution that sought to govern a Gran Colombia that was already disintegrating.

Early vice presidents and functions
The Constitution of 1830 returned to resume the figure of the vice president and was even sanctioned by the vice president in charge at that time, General Domingo Caicedo. This text did not last long before the disintegration of Gran Colombia and gave way to the Constitution of 1832, which changed the rules for the vice-presidency, because, taking into account what happened between Santander and Bolívar, it was established that vice-president be elected two years later. of the president.

This alternate election, which allowed the vice president to be there for two administrations, was proposed to avoid rivalries. In addition, it was established that the vice president would be in charge of presiding over the Council of State, a body that at that time was consultative in nature to advise the president in decision-making.

Between 1832 and 1858 the country faced various civil wars -such as the War of the Supreme Court-, suffered coups -such as that of José María Melo- and had several constituent texts, but always had the figure of the vice president. However, in the Constitution of 1858, of a liberal nature, the questioned figure was knocked down and three appointees were given the opportunity to replace the president in his absence.

Given the liberal intention of having a restricted Executive power, the figure of the vice president did not fit into the Colombian order, for which reason it only came to be rescued in 1886, with the regeneration. The new conservative constitution once again brought the figure of the vice president to the Colombian legal system. Rafael Núñez took advantage of this figure to get himself elected and leave his vice president in power.

Emergence of the modern vice presidency
The first on this list was Eliseo Payan, who was vice president in 1886, but he was promptly removed due to his closeness to liberal federalist ideas, which clashed with the thought of regeneration. The position was assumed by Miguel Antonio Caro, who for many was the power behind the throne during the Núñez government: the first president retired to his El Cabrero hacienda, in Cartagena, while Caro governed. Even with the death of Núñez in 1894, Caro continued to lead the country for two more years.

The government of Núñez -or of Caro to be more precise- was followed by the conservative Manuel Antonio Sanclemente, elected to the presidency in 1898. He arrived at the first magistracy at the age of 84 and had the bad luck that during his tenure the War of the Thousand Days. Given the weakness of the government, Vice President José Manuel Marroquín was encouraged by the conservatives themselves to launch a coup, which occurred on July 31, 1900.

Marroquín was succeeded by Rafael Reyes. At that time, the position of the vice presidency was respected and had great political value, which even served as a counterweight to the president. That is why Reyes, in his authoritarian desire, ended the figure of the vice presidency in 1905, at the same time that he ordered the closure of Congress. Faced with a possible lack of the first president, it was the ministers who had to choose his replacement, despite the fact that the constitutional order returned with the resignation of Rafael Reyes in 1810, the vice presidency was not reestablished. The history of disputes and the Marroquín coup convinced Congress that the best option was for the Legislature to establish appointees in the absence of the president.

Constitutional roles

Successor to the president
In absence of both the president and the vice president, Article 203 of the Constitution of 1991 establishes that the presidential office will be assumed by a minister in the order of precedence established by law. The assuming minister has to be a member of the same party or movement the original president belonged to, and will exercise the presidency until the Congress, within the 30 days following the presidential vacancy, elects a new vice president who will assume the presidency.

Constitutional mandate
According to the Decree 2719 of 17 December 2000 in the Colombian Constitution of 1991 which modified the structure of the Administrative Department of the Presidency of the Republic, the functions of the vice president are:
 To execute special missions set by the President of Colombia and in accordance with the Colombian Constitution. 
 Advise the president on the execution of policies and politics regarding Human Rights and Corruption.
 Collaborate with the Colombian government's management of international and national activities regarding Human Rights and corruption. 
 Plan mechanisms to harmonize agreements between the different levels of the executive government in Colombia on issues regarding Human Rights and corruption.
 Represent Colombia internationally as ordered by the president. 
 By determination of the president, the vice president will support and advise the president on other issues.
 Other functions will be addressed according to the needs of the president.

Selection process

Eligibility
The vice president must be a natural-born citizen of Colombia, at least 30 years of age. The Colombian Constitution of 1991 requires the vice president to meet the same eligibility requirements as the president that can be re-elected. Individuals are eligible to serve an unlimited number of terms as vice president.

See also
 List of vice presidents of Colombia

References

External link
 Vice Presidencia de Colombia official website
 Biblioteca Luis Angel Arango – List of Vice Presidents of Colombia

Colombia
Government of Colombia
 
1819 establishments in Gran Colombia

fr:Liste des vice-présidents de Colombie